Al-Ajshub is a sub-district located in the Shar'ab ar-Rawnah District, Taiz Governorate, Yemen. Al-Ajshub had a population of 8,765 according to the 2004 census.

References

Sub-districts in Shar'ab ar-Rawnah District